Roosevelt is a town in Taylor County, Wisconsin, United States. The population was 444 at the 2000 census. The village of Lublin lies within the town of Roosevelt. The unincorporated community of Bellinger is also located partially in the town.

Geography
According to the United States Census Bureau, the town has a total area of 34.5 square miles (89.4 km2), of which, 34.4 square miles (89.1 km2) of it is land and 0.1 square miles (0.3 km2) of it (0.38%) is water.

On the east edge of Roosevelt is Diamond Lake, a Wisconsin State Natural Area, which is managed as an ecological reference area.

History
In July 1847 a crew working for the U.S. government surveyed the boundaries of the six mile square which would become Roosevelt. Then in June 1854 another crew marked all the section corners in the township, walking through the woods and swamps, measuring with chain and compass. When done, the deputy surveyor filed this general description:
The Surface of This Township is generally Broken Soil(?) poor 3rd Rate. Timber is principally Hemlock. There is Some little White Pine Scattered through the Township but of poor quality. The Township is well watered with numerous Small Streams. There are no Settlers in the Township.

The Taylor County Board created the Town of Roosevelt in 1905.

Demographics
As of the census of 2000, there were 444 people, 149 households, and 116 families residing in the town. The population density was 12.9 people per square mile (5.0/km2). There were 169 housing units at an average density of 4.9 per square mile (1.9/km2). The racial makeup of the town was 100.00% White.

There were 149 households, out of which 34.9% had children under the age of 18 living with them, 65.1% were married couples living together, 9.4% had a female householder with no husband present, and 22.1% were non-families. 18.1% of all households were made up of individuals, and 12.8% had someone living alone who was 65 years of age or older. The average household size was 2.98 and the average family size was 3.42.

In the town, the population was spread out, with 27.7% under the age of 18, 8.6% from 18 to 24, 22.5% from 25 to 44, 23.9% from 45 to 64, and 17.3% who were 65 years of age or older. The median age was 39 years. For every 100 females, there were 112.4 males. For every 100 females age 18 and over, there were 112.6 males.

The median income for a household in the town was $32,000, and the median income for a family was $37,750. Males had a median income of $26,786 versus $24,500 for females. The per capita income for the town was $15,476. About 10.4% of families and 9.0% of the population were below the poverty line, including 4.5% of those under age 18 and 17.5% of those age 65 or over.

Notable people

 Joseph Sweda, Wisconsin State Representative, farmer, and businessman, lived in the town; Sweda served as chairman of the Roosevelt Town Board

References

Towns in Taylor County, Wisconsin
Towns in Wisconsin